Kwok Kin Pong (born 30 March 1987 in Hong Kong) is a former Hong Kong professional footballer who currently plays for Hong Kong Third Division club Ravia Group. He plays as a defender or a midfielder. As he resembles Hong Kong artist and singer Edison Chen, he was given the nickname 'Edison'.

Kwok was charged by the ICAC on match fixing charges in 2017 but was subsequently cleared.

Club career

Youth career
He was promoted from the youth team of South China.

South China

2004–05 season
He made his debut for the club in the 2003–04 season when he was 15 years old. The opponent of the First Division match was Fire Services.

2008–09 season
In the 2009 AFC Cup, he scored the opening goal with a header against Home United FC in the second round match, paving the way for South China's 4:0 victory. His performance in the match was described by coach Kim Pan-Gon as beyond imaginations, as he has been frozen out for much of the season due to poor form and the abundance of attacking talent in the South China squad.

2009–10 season
Kwok Kin Pong started 2009–10 season strongly, scoring two goals against Tai Chung FC.

Kwok Kin Pong scored the third goal for South China in the away game to FK Neftchi Farg'ona in the 4:5 defeat.

Kwok was chosen, along with teammate Au Yeung Yiu Chung, to train with Tottenham Hotspur's first team in October 2010 for a week, as part of their development. The visit represents part of Spurs' commitment to supporting the development of the club's partners and support for football development in Hong Kong and China. Upon his return, he promptly scores a goal against Tai Po FC at the 38-minute to help South China to an eventual 2:1 victory.

In the 2010 AFC Cup, Kwok Kin Pong scored against Persiwa Wamena in South China's 6:3 home win.

2010–11 season
In the 2011 AFC Cup, Kwok Kin Pong scored the equalising goal for South China in the away game to East Bengal FC, but in the end the match ended 3:3.

Eastern
Loan to Eastern.

Pegasus
Pong transferred to Pegasus in 2015 and soon became the captain. He, along with three teammates, were arrested by the ICAC on 7 October 2016 on charges of match fixing. Pegasus suspended all players whom were charged, including Pong, until their respective investigations were completed.

On 19 April 2018, Kwok was found not guilty of conspiracy to defraud after the judge ruled that he could not convict him beyond a reasonable doubt.

International career

Hong Kong U23

Kwok Kin Pong was a member of the Hong Kong national under-23 football team that won the 2009 East Asian Games gold medal.

Despite missing the Long Teng Cup in Taiwan due to his training opportunity at Tottenham Hotspur, Kwok Kin Pong was named in the squad for the 2010 Asian Games. In the tournament, he helped Hong Kong progress to the second round for the first time in 52 years.

Honours
Hong Kong U23
2009 East Asian Games Football Event: Gold

Career statistics
As of 23 August 2011

Under-23 International career
As of 11 November 2010

International career
As of 5 March 2014

References
 Scaafc.com 傳媒報導 – 2007-03-10 「一球成名」專欄 我在南華的青蔥歲月 郭建邦 <蘋果日報> (in Chinese)

External links
 Kwok Kin Pong at HKFA
 

1987 births
Living people
Hong Kong footballers
Association football forwards
South China AA players
Eastern Sports Club footballers
TSW Pegasus FC players
Happy Valley AA players
Hong Kong First Division League players
Hong Kong Premier League players
Hong Kong international footballers
Footballers at the 2006 Asian Games
Footballers at the 2010 Asian Games
Asian Games competitors for Hong Kong